Marstoniopsis insubrica is a species of minute freshwater snail with an operculum, an aquatic gastropod mollusk or micromollusk in the family Amnicolidae.

This is a critically endangered species.

Distribution
This species lives in some areas in Northern, Western, Central, and Eastern Europe, including:
 Germany - critically endangered (vom Aussterben bedroht)
 Great Britain, rare

Habitat
This tiny snail does not tolerate running water; it prefers lakes and quiet areas within large rivers and canals.

References

External links
 Horsák M., Schenková V. & Páll-Gergely B. (2013). "Fossil records of Marstoniopsis insubrica (Küster, 1853) suggest its wide distribution in Central Europe during the Early Holocene". Malacologia 56(1-2): 339-342. .

Amnicolidae
Gastropods described in 1853